Patrick Daly was an Irish politician, vintner and farmer. He was first elected to Dáil Éireann as a Cumann na nGaedheal Teachta Dála (TD) for the Cork East constituency at the 1933 general election. He was elected as a Fine Gael TD for the Cork North constituency at the 1937 and 1938 general elections. He lost his seat at the 1943 general election, and was an unsuccessful candidate at the 1944 general election.

References

Year of birth missing
Year of death missing
Cumann na nGaedheal TDs
Fine Gael TDs
Members of the 8th Dáil
Members of the 9th Dáil
Members of the 10th Dáil
Politicians from County Cork
Irish farmers